The 1989 Allan Cup was the Canadian senior ice hockey championship for the 1988–89 senior "AAA" season.  The event was hosted by the Thunder Bay Twins in Thunder Bay, Ontario.  The 1989 tournament marked the 81st time that the Allan Cup has been awarded.

Teams
Bassano Hawks (Pacific)
Equipe Chomedey Montreal (East)
St. Boniface Mohawks (West)
Thunder Bay Twins (Host)

Results
Round Robin
St. Boniface Mohawks 5 - Thunder Bay Twins 3
St. Boniface Mohawks 4 - Bassano Hawks 2
Thunder Bay Twins 6 - Equipe Chomedey Montreal 3
Equipe Chomedey Montreal 8 - Bassano Hawks 7 (OT)
Thunder Bay Twins 7 - Bassano Hawks 1
St. Boniface Mohawks 9 - Equipe Chomedey Montreal 7
Semi-final
Thunder Bay Twins 6 - Equipe Chomedey Montreal 3
Best-of-3 Final
Thunder Bay Twins 2 - St. Boniface Mohawks 0
Thunder Bay Twins 4 - St. Boniface Mohawks 2

External links
Allan Cup archives 
Allan Cup website

Allan Cup
Sports competitions in Thunder Bay
Allan